Holger Münch (born 17 August 1961) is a German police officer and since 2014 president of the Federal Criminal Police Office.

Life and career
Münch was born 1961 in Bremen and started in 1978 as a police officer in the force of his home town.
From 2009 to 2011 he was chief of police in Bremen.

Since December 2014 Münch has been serving as president of the 'Bundeskriminalamt' (Federal Criminal Police Office), a German federal law enforcement board, which is roughly comparable to the FBI.

During Münch's time in office, the BKA notably conducted a coordinated 2017 campaign across 14 states, raiding the homes of 36 people accused of hateful postings over social media, including threats, coercion and incitement to racism.

Other activities
 Max Planck Institute for the Study of Crime, Security and Law, Member of the Board of Trustees

References

1961 births
Living people
German police chiefs